St. Vincent School is a private, non-sectarian school located in West Avenue, Quezon City which offers preschool, grade school and high school. Its Teacher's Village campus offers only preschool and grade school.

St. Vincent was opened in 1979, and is named in honor of Saint Vincent Ferrer.

Notable alumni
Angelica Panganiban ⁣— actress
Paula Peralejo⁣ — actress
Junjun Cabatu⁣ — professional basketball player.

Educational institutions established in 1979
Elementary schools in Metro Manila
High schools in Metro Manila
Schools in Quezon City